T. Gopal (Gopal Tilkam) (born 20 August 1941) is a former volleyball player from India. He captained the India national team at the 1966 Asian Games.

Overview

In the Inter-Civil Services All India Tournaments, Gopal represented the Andhra Pradesh Civil Service volleyball team:

At the All India Inter Departmental Nationals, he represented the Andhra Pradesh Police Team:

 means Gopal was captain of the Andhra Pradesh Police Team
At the All India Inter-Police Meets, he represented the Andhra Pradesh Police Team and helped the team to the following results:

At the National Volleyball Championship, he represented Andhra Pradesh:

International matches
Gopal competed in the following international competitions:
Represented the Indian volleyball team in the Inter-National Matches.
1961 – Represented India in the test match against the visiting Japanese team held at Calcutta.
1962 – Was a member of the Indian volleyball team which participated in the Asian Games at Jakarta and received a silver medal.
1963 – Was a member of the Indian volleyball team which toured the USSR. The team won against the Romanian team, who were European champions.
1964 – Was a member of the Indian volleyball team which participated in the Olympics at Delhi in which all the Asian countries participated and won the bronze medal.
1965 – Was a captain of the Indian volleyball team which played five test matches against the visiting USSR team. The tests were played at Delhi, Bhilai, Rowa, Calcutta, and Cuttack.
1965 – The Indian team also played two unofficial matches against the Russian team at Balaghat and Allahabad. Gopal was captain of the team in these matches.
1966 – Captain of the Indian volleyball team which participated in the Asian Games at Bangkok.
1967 – Captain of the Indian team against the visiting Ceylonese volleyball team. The test matches were held at Calcutta and Dalmianagar.
1970 – Member of the Indian team which played five test matches against the visiting Paris University team. (The Paris University team contained six players who represented the French volleyball team) The tests were played at Hyderabad, Trivandrum, Jamshedpur, Udaipur, and Bombay. Gopal was captain of the Indian team at Hyderabad.

Post-playing career
After his playing career ended, Gopal did the following:
1981 – Attended International Referee's Course at London (UK) and official matches at the Commonwealth Games in Nottingham.
1982 – Officiated international matches in 9th Asian Games held at New Delhi.
1983 – Officiated test matches between India and USSR in India.
1990 – Visited as a Chief-De-Mission of the Andhra Pradesh team which participated in the international tournament held at Perth, Australia and won third place.
1991 – Visited as Chief-De-Mission of the Indian junior team which participated in the 5th Indian Asian Games held at Bangkok.
Senior Vice President of Andhra Pradesh Volleyball Association and retired at the Police Department as a Superintendent of Police, Intelligence.

Awards
Uttam Seva Patkam
Mahonnatha Seva Patkam 15 August 1999
Indian Police Medal
Was awarded a plaque by Sri. Sarvepalli Radhakrishnan, Vice-President of India, at New Delhi in 1961 during the National Games.
Received Bronze Medal from Sri. Zakir Hussain, President of India, in Pre-Olympic Games held at New Delhi in 1964.
Received a memento from President Neelam Sanjiva Reddy in July 1979.

References

External links 
 http://tilkamgopal.webs.com/

Indian men's volleyball players
1941 births
Living people
Volleyball players from Hyderabad, India
Place of birth missing (living people)
Asian Games medalists in volleyball
Volleyball players at the 1962 Asian Games
Volleyball players at the 1966 Asian Games
Medalists at the 1962 Asian Games
Asian Games silver medalists for India